A.S. Meteora Football Club is a Greek football club, based in Kalabaka, Trikala, Greece. It is named after the Meteora Greek Orthodox monasteries which are located in the town.

Honours

Domestic

 Trikala FCA Champions (9):
 1974–75, 1977–78, 1979–80, 1985–86, 1996–97, 2001–02, 2008–09, 2011–12, 2017–18
 Trikala FCA Cup Winners (13):
 1975–76, 1977–78, 1978–79, 1980–81, 1981–82, 1983–84, 1984–85, 1997–98, 1999–2000, 2001–02, 2002–03, 2007–08, 2013–14

Current squad

References

Football clubs in Thessaly
Trikala (regional unit)
Association football clubs established in 1929
1929 establishments in Greece
Gamma Ethniki clubs